Proposition 203 may refer to several propositions numbered 203.

Arizona
 Arizona Proposition 203 (2010)
 English for Children (Arizona Proposition 203, 2000)